Ringelbach is a small river of Rhineland-Palatinate, Germany. It is a right tributary of the Üßbach near Mosbruch.

See also
List of rivers of Rhineland-Palatinate

References 

Rivers of the Eifel
Rivers of Rhineland-Palatinate
Rivers of Germany